Jesper Storm (born 23 July 1982) is a Danish handballer, currently playing for Danish Handball League side Aarhus GF. He joined the club in 2002.

He has previously played for league rivals KIF Kolding.

External links
 Player info

1982 births
Living people
Danish male handball players
KIF Kolding players